Tamanna Begum (1944 – 20 February 2012) was a Pakistani film and television actress.

Early life and career
Actress Tamanna was born in Aligarh, Uttar Pradesh, India.
Tamanna started her media career from Radio Pakistan, Lahore in 1960 as a presenter and later performed in theater plays before joining films.
She ventured into films in 1962 with the film Daaman (film) and continued working in the Pakistani film industry until the late 1980s. She had performed in over 260 films and in hundreds of TV drama serials. She often appeared in negative roles but also performed some entertaining and comedy roles also.

Filmography
Tamanna did a total of 263 films.

Some of her popular films are:
Daaman (1963 film) - Her debut film as an actress 
 Ashiana (1964 film) 
 Naseeb Apna Apna
Afshan (1971)
Ilzaam (1972)
Nadaan (1971)
Muhabbat (1972 film)
Umrao Jaan Ada (1972 film)
Anmol (1973 film)
Bharosa (1977)
Behen Bhai(1979)
Sohra Te Jawai (1980)
Mehndi (1996 film)

After over a decade of a career in films, she joined television and appeared in many character roles in Pakistani TV drama serials.

Awards and recognition
 Nigar Award for Best Supporting Actress in 1977 for film Bharosa (1977).

Death
Tamanna Begum died after a protracted illness in Karachi on 20 February 2012 at the age of 68. She had had a heart attack some time ago and was under treatment in a private hospital. The heart attack had led to kidneys' failure and she used to have dialysis treatment twice a week. She could not fully recover, though, and finally died.

Among the survivors are a daughter, son-in-law and many grandchildren.

References

Pakistani film actresses
2012 deaths
1944 births
Pakistani radio presenters
Pakistani television actresses
Pakistani stage actresses
Actresses from Karachi
Radio personalities from Karachi
20th-century Pakistani actresses
Pakistani women radio presenters